McGreevey is an Irish surname originating in Clare Ireland. Notable people with the surname include:

 Dina Matos McGreevey, Jim McGreevey's ex-wife
 Jim McGreevey (born 1957), 52nd Governor of New Jersey
 John McGreevey (1922−2010), American screenwriter
 Michael McGreevey (born 1948), American actor and screenwriter

References

See also
 MacGreevy
 McGreevy